Beresje  is a village in Setomaa Parish, Võru County in southeastern Estonia.

The village of Beresje represents a typical fishermen village, where all the houses are built in rows parallel to the shore of the Lake Pihkva. The village was first mentioned in 1582 and it belonged to Poloda area. The main activity was fishing (mainly sparling) and fish processing. The name is believed to be derived from the Russian word berjoza ('birch').

Beresje is the only village in Setomaa, which is still inhabited by Old Believers or “starovers”. At the end of the village there is a village cemetery, which also includes the burial site of the Old Believers. Beresje mere is a relic lake of Lake Peipsi.

Before the administrative reform of Estonian local governments in 2017, the village belonged to Mikitamäe rural municipality and Põlva county.

References

Villages in Võru County